No Face, No Name, No Number is a song from Modern Talking's ninth album, Year of the Dragon. Written by Dieter Bohlen in 2000, it was released as a remix single, containing four remixes of the song, but the album version charted in some airplay charts. Dieter Bohlen has sampling of the Melody, of the song Today, Tonight, Tomorrow on the Deutschland sucht den Superstar album United.

In 2010, ex-Miss Universe Oxana Fedorova recorded the song "At Step One", which is considered to be a plagiarism of "No Face, No Name, No Number".

Track listing

Remixes 
 "No Face, No Name, No Number" (Latin Radio Mix) - 3:05
 "No Face, No Name, No Number" (Airplay Disco Mix) - 3:35
 "No Face, No Name, No Number" (Latin Club Mix) - 8:19
 "No Face, No Name, No Number" (Extended Disco Mix) - 6:39

Charts

Weekly charts

Year-end charts

See also
List of Romanian Top 100 number ones of the 2000s

References 

Modern Talking songs
2000 singles
Songs written by Dieter Bohlen
1999 songs
Number-one singles in Romania
Ariola Records singles